Commander Donald Arthur Gary (July 23, 1901 – April 9, 1977) was an officer of the United States Navy during World War II.

Biography

Gary was born in Findlay, Ohio, on July 23, 1901. He enlisted in the navy in December 1919 and served continuously in the enlisted ranks until November 1943, when he received a commission as a lieutenant, junior grade. In 1943 and 1944, Lieutenant junior grade Gary was assigned to the Third Naval District and as an inspector of machinery at the Babcock & Wilcox Company. In December 1944, he was sent to the aircraft carrier Franklin as an engineering officer.

When that ship was severely damaged by Japanese air attack on March 19, 1945, Lieutenant Gary discovered 300 men trapped in a blackened mess compartment and, finding an exit, returned repeatedly to lead groups to safety. Gary later organized and led firefighting parties to battle the inferno on the hangar deck and entered number three fireroom to raise steam in one boiler, braving extreme hazards in so doing. For his heroism on that occasion, he was awarded the Medal of Honor on January 23, 1946.

Subsequently, promoted to the ranks of lieutenant and lieutenant commander, Gary remained with Franklin until she was decommissioned in February 1947. He was then assigned to the Naval Disciplinary Barracks at Terminal Island, California, where he served until relieved of active duty pending retirement, which took place in June 1950. On the basis of his combat awards, he was advanced to the rank of commander upon retirement. Commander Donald A. Gary died in 1977.

Namesake
In 1983, the guided missile frigate  was named in honor of Donald A. Gary.

Medal of Honor citation

For conspicuous gallantry and intrepidity at the risk of his life above and beyond the call of duty as an Engineering Officer attached to the U.S.S. Franklin when that vessel was fiercely attacked by enemy aircraft during the operations against the Japanese Home Islands near Kobe, Japan, March 19, 1945. Stationed on the third deck when the ship was rocked by a series of violent explosions set off in her own ready bombs, rockets and ammunition by the hostile attack, Lieutenant Gary unhesitatingly risked his life to assist several hundred men trapped in a messing compartment filled with smoke, and with no apparent egress. As the imperiled men below decks became increasingly panic-stricken under the raging fury of incessant explosions, he confidently assured them he would find a means of effecting their release and, groping through the dark, debris-filled corridors, ultimately discovered an escapeway. Staunchly determined, he struggled back to the messing compartment three times despite menacing flames, flooding water and the ominous threat of sudden additional explosions, on each occasion calmly leading his men through the blanketing pall of smoke until the last one had been saved. Selfless in his concern for his ship and his fellows, he constantly rallied others about him, repeatedly organized and led fire-fighting parties into the blazing inferno on the flight deck and, when firerooms 1 and 2 were found to be inoperable, entered the No. 3 fireroom and directed the raising of steam in one boiler in the face of extreme difficulty and hazard. An inspiring and courageous leader, Lieutenant Gary rendered self-sacrificing service under the most perilous conditions and, by his heroic initiative, fortitude and valor, was responsible for the saving of several hundred lives. His conduct throughout reflects the highest credit upon himself and upon the United States Naval Service.

See also

List of Medal of Honor recipients
List of Medal of Honor recipients for World War II

References

United States Navy personnel of World War II
United States Navy Medal of Honor recipients
People from Findlay, Ohio
Military personnel from Ohio
United States Navy officers
Burials at Fort Rosecrans National Cemetery
1901 births
1977 deaths
World War II recipients of the Medal of Honor